The WACO primary glider or simply WACO glider, was an early product of the Waco Aircraft Company. The low cost glider was intended to be flown from low hills or towed by a vehicle.

Design and development
The WACO glider was marketed as a low-cost training aircraft for individuals or glider clubs. About 300 were produced between 1930 and 1931. Replicas have been made using both steel tube or wood frames. Plans are still available for homebuilt construction.

The glider was designed to fly at low airspeeds. The fuselage is made of welded steel tubing. The wings use spruce spars, are wire supported and fabric covered. A releasable tow hook was mounted on the front.

Aircraft on display
Experimental Aircraft Association founder Paul Poberezny first learned to fly in a rebuilt WACO Primary glider. In 2002 a replica was built and flown by Poberezny in 2003. It is now on display at the EAA AirVenture Museum in Oshkosh, Wisconsin.

An original WACO primary glider is in the collection of the National Air and Space Museum.

Specifications (WACO primary glider)

References

Glider aircraft
Primary